The Mosman Art Prize is an annual art award made by the corporation of Mosman, a suburb of Sydney, New South Wales. It has been running since 1947. Past adjudicators also include notable Australian art figures such as Margaret Preston, John Olsen, Tim Storrier, Jenny Sages and Edmund Capon.

List of winners

References

External links 
selected winners

Australian art awards
Awards established in 1947
1947 establishments in Australia
Mosman, New South Wales